Jennifer Love Hewitt is the self-titled third studio album by actress and recording artist Jennifer Love Hewitt. It was released on September 3, 1996 by Atlantic Records.

Track listing

Personnel
Jennifer Love Hewitt – vocals, background vocals
Paul Adamy – bass
Alex Al – bass
John Avarese – synthesizer
Eric Bazilian – guitar
Wayne Cohen – acoustic guitar, bass, electric guitar, keyboard, background vocals, loops
Melvin Davis – bass
Valerie Davis – background vocals
Charles Julian Fearing – rhythm guitar
David Flemming – drums, keyboard
Jimmy Greco – drums
Doug Grigsby – drums
Joel Kipnis – acoustic guitar, electric guitar
Fran Lucci – background vocals
Billy Mann – water effects
Howard McCrary – keyboard
Robert Palmer – drums, wah wah guitar
Danny Powers – guitar
Michael Sembello – guitar, background vocals
Ira Siegel – guitar, electric guitar, steel guitar

Production
Producers: Wayne Cohen, Skip Drinkwater, David Flemming, Jimmy Greco, Joel Kipnis, Howard McCrary, Robert Palmer, Dick Rudolph, Michael Sembello
Executive producer: Rich Christina
Engineers: Joe Alexander, Brad Davis, David Flemming, Robert Mitchell, Greg Mull, Chris Papastephanou, Chris Roberts
Assistant engineers: Brad Catlett, Tony Meador, Stephanie Sylden
Mixing: Joe Alexander, Brad Davis, Skip Drinkwater, David Flemming, Chris Roberts
Mixing assistant: Stephanie Gylden
Mastering: Rick Essig
Drum programming: David Flemming, Jimmy Greco, Robert Palmer
Keyboard programming: Dave Cintron, David Clinton
Vocal programming: Wayne Cohen, Peter Zizzo
Programming: Michael Sembello
Project coordinators: Brad Davis, Richard J. Davis
Rhythm arrangements: David Flemming
Vocal arrangement: Valerie Davis, Joel Kipnis, Larry Loftin, Billy Mann, Howard McCrary, Robert Palmer, Conner Reeves, Peter Zizzo
Art direction: Elizabeth Barrett
Design: Elizabeth Barrett
Photography: Diego Uchitel

References

1996 albums
Jennifer Love Hewitt albums
Atlantic Records albums